Calochilus therophilus, commonly known as the late beard orchid, is a species of orchid endemic to eastern Australia. It has a single channelled, dark green leaf with a reddish base and up to fifteen dull greenish flowers with bold red stripes. The labellum has a dark purplish beard with two "eye" spots. Unlike that of other beard orchids, there is no prominent ridge between the eye spots.

Description
The leaf is fully developed when the first flower opens. The lateral sepals are a similar length but narrower. The column has two purple coloured "eyes" joined by a faint ridge. Flowering occurs from December to March.

Taxonomy and naming
Calochilus therophilus was first formally described in 2006 by David Jones and the description was published in Australian Orchid Research from a specimen collected on Black Mountain in the Australian Capital Territory. The specific epithet (therophilus) is derived from the Greek words theros meaning "summer" and philos "loving", referring to the summer flowering period of this orchid.

Distribution and habitat
The late beard orchid grows in open forest or with grasses and shrubs on mountain slopes. It occurs in central eastern Queensland, eastern New South Wales, the Australian Capital Territory and north-eastern Victoria.

References

therophilus
Endemic orchids of Australia
Orchids of New South Wales
Orchids of the Australian Capital Territory
Orchids of Victoria (Australia)
Orchids of Queensland
Plants described in 2006